Desmarest is the name of more than one French scientist:
Nicolas Desmarest (1725–1815), and
his son, Anselme Gaëtan Desmarest (1784–1838)
his son, Eugène Anselme Sébastien Léon Desmarest (1816–1889) 

Desmarest is also the name of:

Henri Desmarest (or Desmarets) (1661–1741), French Baroque composer 
Thierry Desmarest (born 1940), French chairman of petroleum group Total S.A.